Patrik Eklöf is a Swedish former footballer and football manager. He made 11 Allsvenskan appearances for Djurgårdens IF. He managed Djurgårdens IF's women's team during the 2011 and 2012 seasons.

References 

Swedish footballers
Swedish football managers
Djurgårdens IF Fotboll players
Djurgårdens IF Fotboll (women) managers
Year of birth missing (living people)
Living people
Allsvenskan players
Association footballers not categorized by position
Damallsvenskan managers
Elitettan managers